VC-9 (Composite Squadron Nine) was an aircraft squadron of the United States Navy. The squadron was decommissioned in 1945 at Arlington, Washington.

References

External links
 History of VC-9

Composite squadrons of the United States Navy